Wayfarer is an album by the Jan Garbarek Group, featuring the Norwegian saxophonist Garbarek with Bill Frisell, Eberhard Weber and Michael Di Pasqua. It was released in 1983 on the ECM label.

The Allmusic review awards the album 3 stars.

Track listing 
Compositions by Jan Garbarek.

"Gesture" – 8:48
"Wayfarer" – 9:36
"Gentle" – 5:30
"Pendulum" – 10:24
"Spor" – 7:53
"Singsong" – 4:17

Personnel 
 Jan Garbarek – tenor and soprano saxophone
 Bill Frisell – electric guitar
 Eberhard Weber – double bass
 Michael Di Pasqua – drums, percussion

References 

1983 albums
Jan Garbarek albums
ECM Records albums
Albums produced by Manfred Eicher